The discography of The Mars Volta, an American progressive rock group formed in 2001, consists of seven studio albums, one live album, two extended plays, and nine singles. The final lineup of The Mars Volta consisted of the two founding members Omar Rodríguez-López on guitar and production, Cedric Bixler-Zavala on vocals and lyrics, along with Juan Alderete on bass, Marcel Rodríguez-López on keyboards and percussion, and Deantoni Parks on drums.

The band's first studio album De-Loused in the Comatorium was released in 2003 after a European tour supporting the Red Hot Chili Peppers. This concept album was produced by Rick Rubin and is based on the death of El Paso, Texas artist Julio Venegas, who committed suicide in 1996. In early 2005, the band released their second full-length album, Frances the Mute, a concept album based on the story of band associate Jeremy Ward, who died of an apparent heroin overdose in 2003. The album sold over 100,000 copies within the first week of release, and debuted at number four on the Billboard 200. The first single released from the album was "The Widow", which peaked at number 20 on the UK Singles Chart and became the band's only entry on the Billboard Hot 100 at number 95. The live album Scabdates, was released later the same year. Their third studio album Amputechture was released in 2006 and debuted at number 9 on the Billboard 200 selling over 59,000 copies in its opening week. The Bedlam in Goliath, the Mars Volta's fourth studio album, was released 2008 and debuted at a career-best number 3 on the Billboard 200. On June 23, 2009, the Mars Volta released Octahedron, which is the band's first album through Warner Bros. Records. The album spawned two singles, "Cotopaxi" and "Since We've Been Wrong". Recording for their next album, Noctourniquet, began shortly after, though the album wasn't completed and released until March 2012. After a ten-year hiatus, the band released their self-titled seventh album on September 16, 2022.

Albums

Studio albums

Live albums

Box sets

Extended plays

Singles

Promo

Videography

Films

Music videos

See also
At the Drive-In discography
De Facto discography
Omar Rodríguez-López discography
Omar Rodríguez-López filmography

References 

General
 

Specific

External links 

 
 [ The Mars Volta] at AllMusic

Mars Volta, The
Discographies of American artists
Alternative rock discographies